Paul Bender is an American attorney, author, judge, and former dean of the Arizona State University college of law. He was formerly a professor at the University of Pennsylvania Law School.  Over his career Bender has argued more than 20 cases before the United States Supreme Court. He is often cited as an expert in constitutional law.

Education
Bender attended James Madison High School in Brooklyn, New York, where he was a high school classmate with future Supreme Court Justice Ruth Bader Ginsburg. Bender received both his bachelors and J.D. degrees from Harvard University. After law school Bender clerked for Judge Learned Hand of the United States Court of Appeals for the Second Circuit and Justice Felix Frankfurter of the U.S. Supreme Court during the 1959 Term.

Legal career
After his clerkships Bender was a professor at the University of Pennsylvania Law School before becoming dean of the Arizona State University college of law in 1984. In 1965 Bender served as Assistant to U.S. Solicitors General Archibald Cox where he defended the United States in Brenner v. Manson. He later worked as General Counsel to the President's Commission on Obscenity and Pornography from 1968 until 1970. Bender served as dean of the ASU law school until 1989.  In 1993, during the Bill Clinton administration, Bender was appointed Deputy Solicitor General by Drew Days.  Bender continues to teach courses in constitutional law at ASU.

Bender has been the Chief Judge of the court of appeals of the San Carlos Apache Tribe since 2005, and Chief Justice of the Supreme Court of the Fort McDowell Yavapai Nation since 1998.

While Deputy Solicitor General, Bender argued several notable cases, including:
Farmer v. Brennan (1994), in which the Court held that "deliberate indifference" to a substantial risk of serious harm to an inmate is cruel and unusual punishment.
United States v. National Treasury Employees Union (1995),  in which the Court held that section 501(b) of the Ethics in Government Act of 1978 violates the First Amendment.
United States v. Virginia (1996), in which the Supreme Court struck down the Virginia Military Institute (VMI)'s long-standing male-only admission policy.
United States v. Winstar Corp. (1996), in which the Court held that waivers of sovereign power generally must be surrendered in unmistakable terms.
Bush v. Vera (1996), in which the court struck down districts in Texas for racial gerrymandering.

Other notable case Bender has argued before the Court include:
Arizona Christian School Tuition Organization v. Winn, representing the respondent Winn.
Stewart v. Martinez-Villareal.

Bender was a vocal opponent of Miguel Estrada, who worked under Bender at the Solicitor General's office, when Estrada was nominated to the D.C. Circuit Court of Appeals

Arizona redistricting commission
Bender was part of the team that drafted Arizona's Proposition 106, which created the Arizona Independent Redistricting Commission in 2000. Bender subsequently sought one of the five seats on the commission. His nomination was opposed by Republicans in the state legislature and was the subject of an Arizona Supreme Court case: Adams v. Commission on Appellate Court Appointment. The court held that members of tribal courts are not "public officials" for the purpose of the redistricting commission.

Publications
Copyright and First Amendment After Eldred v. Ashcroft, 30 Colum J. L. & Arts 349 (2006)(SSRN).
Foreword, the School Tax Credit Case - a Study in Constitutional Misinterpretation, 32 Ariz. St. L. J. 1 (2000).
1990 Arizona Repatriation Legislation, 24 Ariz. St. L.J. 391 (1992)(SSRN).
Paul Bender (co-author). Political and Civil Rights in the United States (Orig. 1979; 4th Supp. 1982). Boston, Mass.: Little, Brown. , .

See also 
 List of law clerks of the Supreme Court of the United States (Seat 2)

References

External links
ASU Profile
Law Office Profile
Appearances at U.S. Supreme Court, Oyez.com
 

1933 births
20th-century American lawyers
21st-century American judges
American legal scholars
Arizona State University faculty
Copyright scholars
Harvard Law School alumni
James Madison High School (Brooklyn) alumni
Law clerks of Judge Learned Hand
Law clerks of the Supreme Court of the United States
Lawyers from Brooklyn
American scholars of constitutional law
United States Department of Justice lawyers
University of Pennsylvania Law School faculty
Living people